Bozeman is a surname. Notable people with the name include:

Bradley Bozeman (born 1994), American football center 
Cedric Bozeman (born 1983), American basketball player
Harley Bozeman (1891–1971), American salesman, tree farmer, politician, and historian, member of the Louisiana House of Representatives
John Bozeman (1837–1867), American pioneer and frontiersman in the American West who helped establish the Bozeman Trail through Wyoming Territory into the gold fields of southwestern Montana Territory 
Phil Bozeman, member in the band Whitechapel
Terry Bozeman, American actor
Todd Bozeman (born 1963), American college basketball coach
V. Bozeman (born 1988), American soul singer, record producer and actress
Victor Bozeman (1929–1986), American television announcer, voice-over artist and actor
Virgil Bozeman (1912-2007), American politician and lawyer

Fictitious persons
Marcus Bozeman, a character in True Blood
Martha Bozeman, a character in True Blood

See also
Sally Boazman, British radio traffic reporter
Boseman

Jewish surnames